Mike Franckowiak (born March 25, 1953) is a former American football running back. He played for the Denver Broncos from 1975 to 1976 and for the Buffalo Bills from 1977 to 1978.

He played quarterback at Central Michigan.

References

1953 births
Living people
American football running backs
Central Michigan Chippewas football players
Denver Broncos players
Buffalo Bills players
Players of American football from Grand Rapids, Michigan